Rémi Siméon (1 October 1827 in Lurs, Alpes-de-Haute-Provence department, France – 23 November 1890 in Paris, France) was a French lexicographer. Siméon was the author of a dictionary of the Nahuatl language. In 1886, he was elected as a member of the American Philosophical Society.

References

1827 births
1890 deaths
French lexicographers
French male non-fiction writers
Linguists of Uto-Aztecan languages
Classical Nahuatl
Members of the American Philosophical Society
19th-century lexicographers